Alan Tomes (born 6 November 1951) is a former Scotland international rugby union player.

Rugby Union career

Amateur career

Born in Hawick, Tomes moved to Gateshead when he was 8 years old. He played rugby for Gateshead Fell.

His grandfather, still in Hawick, told Robin Charters of his rugby loving grandson in the north-east of England.

Tomes recalls:
Dad got a phonecall from [club stalwart] Robin Charters: 'How big’s this boy of yours, Charlie?’ I was 6ft 5ins so I got asked up to Mansfield Park for a trial. Robin told me to go into the changing-room and introduce myself. Fourteen other guys wondered: 'Who’s this big bugger?’ I was a bit forward, calling myself a replacement for Jim Scott. Plus, Jim Renwick was in full flow with a funny story and I interrupted him. Not an auspicious first day!

He then played for Hawick.

Provincial career

He was capped by South of Scotland District.

He played for Scotland Probables on 11 January 1975.

International career

He was capped by Scotland 'B' against France 'B' in 1975.

He had 48 caps for Scotland.

He toured South Africa in 1980 with the British and Irish Lions.

He also played for the Barbarians. Tomes remembered:
I remember making a 50-yard break for the Barbarians and the attitude of my English colleagues was: 'Middle-rows just don’t do that.' England have never played a loose game whereas, bulk or no bulk, Scots have always wanted to have a go.

References

1951 births
Living people
Scottish rugby union players
British & Irish Lions rugby union players from Scotland
Rugby union locks
Scotland international rugby union players
Hawick RFC players
Scotland 'B' international rugby union players
Scotland Probables players
South of Scotland District (rugby union) players
Barbarian F.C. players
Rugby union players from Hawick